Crassispira mennoi is a species of sea snail, a marine gastropod mollusk in the family Pseudomelatomidae.

Description
The length of the shell attains 4.4 mm.

Distribution
This species occurs in the Caribbean Sea off Curaçao

References

 De Jong K.M. & Coomans H.E. (1988) Marine gastropods from Curaçao, Aruba and Bonaire. Leiden: E.J. Brill. 261 pp.

External links
 

mennoi
Gastropods described in 1988